Frederick Cornwallis, 1st Baron Cornwallis (14 March 1610/1 – January 1662) was an English peer, MP and Privy Counsellor. He was Treasurer of the Household 1660–1662. He was the eldest surviving son of Sir William Cornwallis of Brome, Suffolk, and his second wife, Jane. After his father's death, his mother married Sir Nathaniel Bacon.

Family
Cornwallis married twice. 

He married firstly: Elizabeth Ashburnham, the daughter of Sir John Ashburnham (of Ashburnham, Sussex) and Elizabeth Richardson, 1st Lady Cramond, with 3 sons and a daughter, of whom only Charles Cornwallis, 2nd Baron Cornwallis survived him.

After the wedding, in January 1631, King Charles I, Henrietta Maria and Susan Feilding, Countess of Denbigh wrote to congratulate his mother Jane, Lady Cornwallis Bacon, and ask her to forgive him for his disobedience and return him to her favour. Denbigh said Ashburnham was her cousin "though her family be unfortunate".

Elizabeth died c. February 1643.

He married secondly: Elizabeth Crofts, daughter of Sir Henry Crofts (of Little Saxham), with whom he had a daughter.

Death and legacy
In January 1662, Cornwallis died suddenly of apoplexy. Samuel Pepys recorded his death in the famous Diary, and described him as a  "bold, profane-talking man". Another contemporary source described him as "a man of so cheerful a spirit that no sorrow came next his heart, and of so resolved a mind that no fear came into his thoughts".

References

External links

|-
  

 

1610 births
1662 deaths
17th-century English nobility
Cavaliers
Frederick
Members of the Parliament of England (pre-1707) for Ipswich
Knights Bachelor
Members of the Privy Council of England
People from Brome, Suffolk
Politics of Suffolk
Treasurers of the Household
English MPs 1640 (April)
English MPs 1640–1648
English MPs 1660
Barons Cornwallis